Onalaska Independent School District is a public school district based in Onalaska, Texas, United States. In addition to Onalaska, the district also serves a portion of the unincorporated community of Blanchard.

In 2009, the school district was rated "academically acceptable" by the Texas Education Agency.

Schools
Onalaska Junior/Senior High School (grades 7-12)
Onalaska Elementary School (prekindergarten-grade 6)

References

External links
Onalaska ISD

School districts in Polk County, Texas